Kamil Aliyev (born 15 October 1991) is a visually impaired athlete from Azerbaijan who competes in T12 classification long jump and sprint events. He won a silver medal in the long jump  at the 2016 Summer Paralympics.

References 

1991 births
Living people
Azerbaijani male long jumpers
Azerbaijani male sprinters
Paralympic athletes of Azerbaijan
Athletes (track and field) at the 2016 Summer Paralympics
Paralympic silver medalists for Azerbaijan
Medalists at the 2016 Summer Paralympics
Paralympic medalists in athletics (track and field)
Athletes (track and field) at the 2020 Summer Paralympics
21st-century Azerbaijani people